Harsh Mistress may refer to:

"Harsh Mistress" (The Twilight Zone), an episode of the 2002 TV series The Twilight Zone
Harsh Mistress, original title of the now defunct science fiction magazine Absolute Magnitude

See also
The Moon Is a Harsh Mistress, a 1966 science fiction novel by Robert A. Heinlein